Ralph B. Guy Jr. (born August 30, 1929) is a Senior United States circuit judge of the United States Court of Appeals for the Sixth Circuit.

Education and career
Born in Detroit, Michigan, Guy received an Artium Baccalaureus degree from the University of Michigan in 1951 and  a Juris Doctor from the University of Michigan Law School in 1953. He was in private practice in Dearborn, Michigan from 1954 to 1955. He was an assistant corporation counsel for the City of Dearborn from 1955 to 1958, and corporation counsel for that city until 1968. He was then a Chief Assistant United States Attorney for the Eastern District of Michigan until 1970, going on to serve as the United States Attorney for the Eastern District of Michigan until 1976.

Federal judicial service
On April 26, 1976, Guy was nominated by President Gerald Ford to a seat on the United States District Court for the Eastern District of Michigan vacated by Judge Frederick William Kaess. Guy was confirmed by the United States Senate on May 11, 1976, and received his commission the following day. His service terminated on October 17, 1985, due to elevation to the Sixth Circuit.

On July 23, 1985, President Ronald Reagan nominated Guy to a new seat on the United States Court of Appeals for the Sixth Circuit created by 98 Stat. 333. He was again confirmed by the Senate on October 16, 1985, and received his commission  the following day. He assumed senior status on September 1, 1994.

References

Sources
 

1929 births
Living people
20th-century American judges
Judges of the United States Court of Appeals for the Sixth Circuit
Judges of the United States District Court for the Eastern District of Michigan
Lawyers from Detroit
United States Attorneys for the Eastern District of Michigan
United States court of appeals judges appointed by Ronald Reagan
United States district court judges appointed by Gerald Ford
University of Michigan Law School alumni
Judges of the United States Foreign Intelligence Surveillance Court of Review
Assistant United States Attorneys